Jesse Armando Flores Knowles (born 31 March 1995) is a Costa Rican tennis player.

Flores has a career high ATP singles ranking of 1146 achieved on 2 March 2020. He also has a career high ATP doubles ranking of 1237 achieved on 26 August 2019.

Flores represents Costa Rica at the Davis Cup, where he has a W/L record of 9–3.

Future and Challenger finals

Singles: 0 (0–0)

Doubles 4 (1–3)

References

External links

1995 births
Living people
Costa Rican male tennis players
Sportspeople from Oakville, Ontario
Miami Hurricanes men's tennis players
21st-century Costa Rican people